During the 1997–98 English football season, Queens Park Rangers F.C. competed in the Football League First Division.

Season summary
In the 1997–98 season, QPR did start the campaign brightly but in November, Houston was sacked as manager with the club in 13th place and only four points adrift from the playoff places. Ray Harford was appointed as Houston's replacement and QPR went on to struggle with only three wins at the end of the season since his appointment and only managed to avoid relegation by one point at the expense of Manchester City, Stoke City and Reading.

Final league table

Results
Queens Park Rangers' score comes first

Legend

Football League First Division

FA Cup

League Cup

Players

First-team squad
Squad at end of season

References

Queens Park Rangers F.C. seasons
Queens Park Rangers